Grant Michael Irons (born July 7, 1979) is a former American football defensive end.  He played in 43 career games for the University of Notre Dame, making 26 starts at numerous positions on defense.  He started playing for the Buffalo Bills in 2002. His father Gerald Irons also played for the Raiders.  He is the cousin of Paul Irons, cousin once removed of Kenny Irons and David Irons and the brother of Jarrett Irons.

He was awarded the Dial Award for the national high-school scholar-athlete of the year in 1996. He was also the best teammate and cheerleader on every team he played on. He had 3.5 sacks over 5 seasons for an average of a whopping .7 sacks per year on a 16 game season as a backup defensive end. He had one sack during his 4 year career with the Oakland Raiders at back up defensive end. The picture to the right was during warm ups of a preseason game in 2006.  He took a picture with Warren Buffett while a business student at Notre Dame and they became friends.

Notes

1979 births
Living people
People from Middleburg Heights, Ohio
African-American players of American football
American football defensive linemen
Notre Dame Fighting Irish football players
Oakland Raiders players
Buffalo Bills players
Players of American football from Ohio
Players of American football from Texas
People from The Woodlands, Texas
Sportspeople from Harris County, Texas
21st-century African-American sportspeople
20th-century African-American sportspeople
Irons family (American football)